Tuva Hansen (born 4 August 1997) is a Norwegian footballer who plays as a defender for Frauen Bundesliga club FC Bayern Munich and the Norway national team.

Club career

Klepp (2013) and Arna-Bjørnar (2014) 
Hansen started her senior career in Klepp after having played in Bryne. She debuted in Toppserien in 2013, when she played for Klepp. In 2014, she played for Arna-Bjørnar. In the club, she played together with her older sister Hege Hansen.

Klepp (2015–2020) 
In November 2014, both Tuva and her sister Hege Hansen announced that they moved back to Klepp. In 2015, Tuva played all of the matches for Klepp in Toppserien, and she was nominated for Statoil’s young talent prize. She grew on the experience and became a solid defender. She also became the captain of the club. In 2016, Tuva was named player of the year by Jærbladet, the local newspaper. After the 2016 season, she said no to move to LSK Kvinner, the team that won both Toppserien and the cup that year. In 2018, she was part of the Klepp team that came second, and therefore got silver, in Toppserien. And in 2019, they got bronze.

Sandviken/Brann (2021–2022) 
In November 2020, Sandviken announced that they had signed both Tuva Hansen and her teammate Elisabeth Terland from Klepp. Hansen quickly became a leader in the team and was the captain already from her first season. That season also became a success, and Sandviken won Toppserien 2021 7 November 2021, in the second last match of the season. That match was against Klepp, Hansen’s former club. Sandviken won 8-0, which meant that Klepp got relegated, something that made Hansen cry after the match in an interview with NRK. Sportskollektivet.no named Hansen player of the year 2021.

Bayern Munich (2023-present) 
FC Bayern Munich announced 1 December 2022 that they had signed Hansen. She will officially join the club 1 January 2023, when the transfer window opens.

International career 
Hansen has played matches for several Norway youth national teams, including U15, U16, U17, U19, and U23, and also the Norway national team.

She was called up to the national team for the first time in November 2016. She debuted when she was 19 years old, in a 0-3 loss against Spain in Algarve cup in March 2017.

International goals

Personal life 
Hansen has together with her dog, Vilja, gained much popularity on social media; among others they had over 65 million views on their TikTok profile in August 2021.  As of 10 October 2021, they had 102,000 followers on Instagram and 900,000 on TikTok. Several of their videos have been seen by millions of people.

Hansen has studied to become an occupational therapist.

Tuva Hansen is the daughter of the former footballer Hugo Hansen, and the younger sister of Cato Hansen and Hege Hansen, both of whom have also played in top leagues and national teams. Hege and Tuva have played one match together on the Norway national team. The first match Tuva played for the national team, was also the last match Hege played.

Honours 
With Sandviken
 Toppserien 2021

References

External links
 
 
 
 Player's Profile at Alt Om Fotball

1997 births
Living people
People from Time, Norway
Norway women's international footballers
Norwegian women's footballers
Expatriate sportspeople in Germany
Women's association football defenders
Klepp IL players
Arna-Bjørnar players
SK Brann Kvinner players
Toppserien players
Sportspeople from Rogaland
UEFA Women's Euro 2022 players
UEFA Women's Euro 2017 players